John Parker, 1st Baron Boringdon (1735 – 27 April 1788) was a British peer and Member of Parliament.

Origins

Parker was the eldest son of John Parker (1703–1768) of Boringdon Hall, Plympton, and Saltram House, by his wife Catherine Poulett (1706–1758), whom he married in 1725, a daughter of John Poulett, 1st Earl Poulett, by his wife, Bridget Bertie, a granddaughter of Montagu Bertie, 2nd Earl of Lindsey. He had a sister Henrietta Parker (d. 1808) and a younger brother, Montagu Edmund Parker (1737–1813) of Whiteway House, near Chudleigh (purchased by his grandfather George Parker (d. 1743) who also purchased Saltram), Sheriff of Devon in 1789, who married in 1775 Charity Ourry (1752–1786), daughter of Admiral Paul Ourry, by whom he had issue Montague E. Parker (1778–1831) whose daughter Harriet Parker (1809–1897) married in 1842, as her second husband, her second cousin Edmund Parker, 2nd Earl of Morley (1810–1864).

Career

He was educated at Christ Church, Oxford. John attended Plympton Grammar School where Sir Joshua Reynold's father was headmaster.

He was elected to the House of Commons for Bodmin in 1761, a seat he held until 1762, and then represented Devon between 1762 and 1784. The latter year Parker was raised to the peerage as Baron Boringdon, of Boringdon in the County of Devon.

Apart from his political career he was also a collector of paintings at his seat Saltram House in Devon. He was elected a Fellow of the Royal Society in April 1767. In 1783, Parker's horse Saltram won the fourth running of The Derby.

Marriage and progeny

Lord Boringdon married twice:
Firstly, in 1764 to Frances Hort (d.1764), daughter of the Right Reverend Josiah Hort, Archbishop of Tuam. She died later the same year, without progeny.
Secondly, in 1769, to Theresa Robinson (1744/5-1775), second daughter of Thomas Robinson, 1st Baron Grantham. Lord Boringdon survived her by thirteen years and they had two children. Their son John Parker, 1st Earl of Morley (1772–1840) became Viscount Boringdon and Earl of Morley in 1815 and their daughter Theresa Parker (1775–1856) married George Villiers (1759–1827), youngest son of Thomas Villiers, 1st Earl of Clarendon.

Death and burial
Lord Boringdon died in April 1788.

Notes

References

Kidd, Charles, Williamson, David (editors). Debrett's Peerage and Baronetage (1990 edition). New York: St Martin's Press, 1990, 

National Trust guide book, Saltram, Devon, 2011, p. 65

Boringdon, John Parker, 1st Baron
Boringdon, John Parker, 1st Baron
Alumni of Christ Church, Oxford
Barons Boringdon
Boringdon
Members of the Parliament of Great Britain for Devon
Members of the Parliament of Great Britain for Bodmin
British MPs 1761–1768
British MPs 1768–1774
British MPs 1774–1780
British MPs 1780–1784
Fellows of the Royal Society
Owners of Epsom Derby winners